Tiu Keng Leng station is an MTR station located in Tiu Keng Leng. It is the only station on the Kwun Tong line located in the New Territories. The livery of the station is yellow-green.

The station is situated next to the developments of Kin Ming Estate and Choi Ming Court. Its main entrance is located on Chui Ling Road. There is a public transport area outside the station for interchange to ground-level transport.

History
Tiu Keng Leng station was built under the Tseung Kwan O Extension contract 602, which was awarded in 1999 to the Paul Y-CREC Joint Venture. The station opened on Sunday, 18 August 2002, the day the new Tseung Kwan O line fully opened for service.

Public toilets and a babycare room opened within the paid area on 20 February 2019 as part of an MTR initiative to install such facilities at interchange stations.

Station layout 

Passengers from Tseung Kwan O who wish to travel to other destinations in Kowloon can ride the Tseung Kwan O line to Yau Tong, where they can interchange at the opposite platform for the Kwun Tong line.

Entrances and exits 
A1: Public transport interchange 
A2: Hong Kong Design Institute 
B: Metro Town, Le Point, Caritas Institute of Higher Education

References 

MTR stations in the New Territories
Kwun Tong line
Tseung Kwan O line
Tiu Keng Leng
Railway stations in Hong Kong opened in 2002